Baix Ebre ("Lower Ebre") is a comarca (county), on the coast in southern Catalonia.

Municipalities

References

External links
Official comarcal web site (in Catalan)
map, from the Generalitat de Catalunya web site

 
Comarques of the Province of Tarragona